Holm Sewer is a minor river (brook) and drainage ditch of the Pevensey Levels in Hailsham, Wealden District of East Sussex, England. A tributary to Marland Sewer, Holm Sewer drains water from farmland east of the B2104 road and flows easterly. It receives water from Saltmarsh Sewer.

References 

Rivers of East Sussex
Rivers of the Pevensey Levels